The 1965 Women's Western Open was contested June 10–13 at Beverly Country Club. It was the 36th edition of the Women's Western Open.

This event was won by Susie Maxwell.

Final leaderboard

External links
The Victoria Advocate source

Women's Western Open
Golf in Chicago
Women's Western Open
Women's Western Open
Women's Western Open
Women's Western Open
Women's sports in Illinois
Women in Chicago